International Indian School Jubail or IISJ (formerly Indian Embassy School Jubail) is an English-medium K-12 Indian school in Al Jubail of Saudi Arabia. It was founded on 30 November 1987. The School is part of global International Indian Schools including International Indian School, Riyadh, International Indian School Jeddah.

References

Educational institutions established in 1987
Indian international schools in Saudi Arabia
1987 establishments in Saudi Arabia